is a former Japanese football player and manager.

Playing career
Mochizuki was born in Shizuoka on April 20, 1963. After graduating from Shimizu Higashi High School, he played professionally in the Netherlands, for Haarlem and Telstar between 1982 and 1986. In 1986, he moved back to Japan to play for Yamaha Motors, which later became Júbilo Iwata.

Coaching career
After retiring, Mochizuki began his coaching career and held several positions with the Júbilo Iwata organization before leaving in 2002 to become the coach of Avispa Fukuoka's youth team. He was selected to be the manager of Vegalta Sendai, in the J.League beginning in the 2007 season. However, Sendai failed to return to Division 1 and he resigned from the job after the season. He has previously served as a coach of Vegalta, Shonan Bellmare, and Avispa Fukuoka and also filled in as interim manager at each of those three teams.

Managerial statistics

References

External links

1963 births
Living people
Association football people from Shizuoka Prefecture
Japanese footballers
Expatriate footballers in the Netherlands
Japan Soccer League players
HFC Haarlem players
SC Telstar players
Júbilo Iwata players
Japanese expatriate footballers
Japanese football managers
J2 League managers
Avispa Fukuoka managers
Shonan Bellmare managers
Vegalta Sendai managers
Kawasaki Frontale managers
Association football midfielders